Herm is a masculine given name which may refer to:

Herm Johnson (born 1953), American racing driver
Herm Rohrig (1918–2002), American National Football League player, official and scout

People named Herman who are better known as Herm include:
Herman Edwards (born 1954), American retired National Football League player and head coach and current football analyst
Herm Fuetsch (1918–2010), American basketball player
Herm Gilliam (1946–2005), American basketball player
Herm Harrison (1939–2013), retired football player, member of the Canadian Football Hall of Fame
Herm Starrette (1936–2017), retired relief pitcher and pitching and bullpen coach
Herm Wehmeier (1927–1973), American Major League Baseball pitcher
Herm Winningham (born 1961), American retired Major League Baseball player

See also
John Henry Herm Doscher (1852–1934), American baseball player and umpire